Jerrold H. Zar (born 1941) is an American biologist and Professor Emeritus at Northern Illinois University, having been elected as Fellow to the American Association for the Advancement of Science.

References

1941 births
Living people
Fellows of the American Association for the Advancement of Science
21st-century American biologists
Northern Illinois University faculty